The origin of the name Kven is unclear. The name appears for the first time in a 9th-century Old English version, written by King Alfred of Wessex, of a work by the Roman author Orosius, in the plural form Cwenas. 

Today, however, Kven refers to Finnish (Kven) speaking people who have migrated to northern Norway in relatively recent times, with no connection to the Cwenas/Kænir mentioned in the sagas.

Norwegian background

All ancient references to Kvenland and Kvens seem to be from Old English and Icelandic sources (9th to 13th centuries). Furthermore, most of them seem to have been connected to a certain geographical area in Norway in one way or another:

 Ottar, the source used by King Alfred of Wessex, was from Hålogaland
 Orkneyinga saga described how Nór travelled from Kvenland to Trondheim
 Egil's saga described how Thorolf travelled from Namdalen (north of Trondheim) to Kvenland
 Writer of the publication mentioning Terra Feminarum was especially familiar with Trondheim and also mentioned Hålogaland
 Kvens were mentioned 1271 to have pillaged Hålogaland

This might indicate that the term Kven was originally used in Norwegian dialects around a rather compact area ranging from Trondheim to Hålogaland.

Etymology

The widely accepted view, first presented by Jouko Vahtola, is that kven etymologically originates from Old Norse hvein, meaning "swampy land." Nevertheless, kven is a root which in some cases translates to "woman" in Old Norse. Proto-Germanic *kwinōn, *kunōn; *kwēni-z, *kwēnō "woman" developed into various Old Norse forms: kona; kvǟn, kvān, kvɔ̄n; kvendi; kvenna, kvinna. A reference to Terra Feminarum ("Woman Land") in a Latin text dated to 1075 CE is likely a translation of Kvenland.

Alternatively, kven may be linked to Kainuu, a region of Eastern Finland whose etymology is also disputed.  Similar sounding words to "kainuu" also exist in the Sami languages. In Northern Sami, Gáidnu is a rope made of roots for boats or fishing nets. Gáidnulaŝ refers to a clumsy person and Geaidnu stands for a road or a way. In the early Sami dictionaries Kainolats/Kainahaljo had the meaning Norwegian or Swedish man while Kainahalja had the meaning Norwegian or Swedish women, it could also have the meaning peasant. Helsing village, close to Torneå, was referred to as Cainho.

References 

Kven
Kven